Juan Andreu (born 20 January 1985) is a Spanish handball player for Limoges Handball and the Spanish national team.

References

1985 births
Living people
Spanish male handball players
Sportspeople from Seville
BM Granollers players